Comedy Central is a 24-hour Russian cable television and satellite television comedy channel available in Russia (until April 2022), CIS countries, launched in 2012. It is owned by Paramount Networks EMEAA and Paramount Global.

History
Paramount Comedy was launched in Russia in 2012 & television brand in the United Kingdom (not in 2009) but the comedy central extra one on November 1, 1995, in Spain in March, 1999, in Ireland on May 9, 2004, in Italy on December 1, 2004, and in Russia on April 1, 2012. Paramount Comedy also launched in the Middle East and North Africa in 1996, but it went defunct in 2000. In both the United Kingdom and Spain the channel originally shared the broadcast channel with corporate sibling Nickelodeon, but later the two separated. In Arabia, the channel time-shared with TV Land but the two networks disappeared in 2000.

On 12 February 2009, Paramount Comedy UK&I announced that it was to re-brand as Viacom's international comedy brand Comedy Central on 6 April 2009. Later, most of the rest of international versions of Paramount Comedy completed the re-brand to Comedy Central: Paramount Comedy Italy on May 1, 2007, and Paramount Comedy Spain on May 14, 2014.

By 2017, the channel was one of the last to retain the Paramount Comedy branding. Most have become Comedy Central and the only other holdout was Ukraine (Paramount Comedy launched there in 2017).

In mid-March 2022, due to the invasion of Ukraine, Paramount, which owns the MTV brand, decided to suspend its activities in Russia. Initially, the Paramount Comedy channel (along with all other TV channels of this company) planned to stop broadcasting in Russia on April 20, but eventually broadcasting was discontinued on April 28. In the Commonwealth of Independent States (CIS), as well as Georgia, the broadcasting of Russian-language version of this and other Paramount channels is continuing.

On 14 December 2022 Paramount Comedy ceased broadcasting in Belarus.

On 1 March 2023 both the Russian-language and Ukrainian-language versions of Paramount Comedy were renamed to Comedy Central.

References

Russian-language television stations in Russia
Paramount International Networks
Television channels and stations established in 2012
2012 establishments in Russia
Television channel articles with incorrect naming style